Shōji Station may refer to:
 Shōji Station (Osaka, Osaka) (小路駅) in Ikuno-ku, Osaka, Osaka Prefecture, Japan
 Shōji Station (Toyonaka) (少路駅) in Toyonaka, Osaka Prefecture, Japan